Psychotria rostrata is a South American rainforest understory shrub from the coffee family, Rubiaceae.

References

rostrata